Marta Otrębska is a former Polish football striker.

Career
Throughout her career she played for Czarni Sosnowiec, Medyk Konin, AZS Wroclaw and Gol Częstochowa in Poland's Ekstraliga and, briefly, Turbine Potsdam in the German Bundesliga.

She was a member of the Polish national team for nearly two decades, taking part in 101 games.

References

1968 births
Living people
Polish women's footballers
Expatriate women's footballers in Germany
Place of birth missing (living people)
Women's association football forwards
1. FFC Turbine Potsdam players
Polish expatriate footballers
Polish expatriate sportspeople in Germany
Poland women's international footballers
Frauen-Bundesliga players
Medyk Konin players
KKS Czarni Sosnowiec players